The 1981 All-Ireland Senior Hurling Championship Final was the 94th All-Ireland Final and the culmination of the 1981 All-Ireland Senior Hurling Championship, an inter-county hurling tournament for the top teams in Ireland. The match was held at Croke Park, Dublin, on 6 September 1981, between Galway and Offaly. The reigning champions lost to their Leinster opponents, who won their first senior hurling title, on a score line of 2-12 to 0-15.

Johnny Flaherty scored a handpassed goal in this game; this was before the handpassed goal was ruled out of the game as hurling's technical standards improved.

Match details

References

All-Ireland Senior Hurling Championship Final
All-Ireland Senior Hurling Championship Final, 1981
All-Ireland Senior Hurling Championship Finals
Galway county hurling team matches
Offaly county hurling team matches
All-Ireland Senior Hurling Championship Final